The Breaksea Islands Group is a group of six islands, in the Southern Ocean, off the southwestern coast of Tasmania, Australia.

Located near the mouth of Port Davey, the group comprise the North Breaksea and Main Breaksea Islands, the Fitzroy, Kathleen, and Munday islands, and the Mavourneen Rocks.

Fauna
The islands are noted as a breeding site for many seabird species, including little penguin (400 pairs), short-tailed shearwater (3000-5000 pairs), fairy prion (20 pairs) and silver gull. The Tasmanian tree skink is present. Rabbits were introduced in the 19th century by whalers. and have caused some damage to vegetation and soil.

The islands are part of the Port Davey Islands Important Bird Area, so identified by BirdLife International because of its importance for breeding seabirds.

See also

 List of islands of Tasmania

References

External links
Breaksea Islands, Port Davey and Bathurst Harbour

Protected areas of Tasmania
Important Bird Areas of Tasmania
Islands of South West Tasmania